The following are the football (soccer) events of the year 1925 throughout the world.

Events

Winners club national championship 

Belgium: Germinal Beerschot
Denmark: Kjøbenhavns Boldklub
England: Huddersfield Town
Germany: 1. FC Nürnberg
Greece: Regional Championships :EPSA (Athens) Panathinaikos, EPSP (Piraeus)Olympiacos, EPSP (Patras)Panachaiki
Hungary: MTK Hungária
Iceland: Fram
Italy: Bologna F.C. 1909
Paraguay: Olimpia Asunción
Poland: Pogoń Lwów
Scotland: For fuller coverage, see 1924–25 in Scottish football.
Scottish Division One – Rangers
Scottish Division Two – Dundee United
Scottish Cup – Celtic

International tournaments
 1925 British Home Championship (October 22, 1924 – April 18, 1925)

 1924-28 Nordic Football Championship (June 15, 1924 – October 7, 1928) 1925: (June 14 – August 23, 1925)
 (1925)
 (1924–1928)

 South American Championship 1925 in Argentina (November 29, 1925 – December 25, 1925)

Births
 17 February: Erich Retter; German international footballer (died 2014)
 28 February: Josef Röhrig, German international footballer (died 2014)
 4 May: Jenő Buzánszky, Hungarian international footballer (died 2015)
 5 May: Željko Čajkovski, Croatian international footballer and coach (died 2016)
 11 May: Max Morlock, German international footballer (died 1994)
 16 May: Nílton Santos, Brazilian international footballer (died 2013)
 July 25: Juan Alberto Schiaffino, Uruguayan international footballer (died 2002)
 August 6: Matías González, Uruguayan international footballer (died 1984)

Deaths

References 

 
Association football by year